Cyrtodactylus consobrinoides is a species of gecko that is endemic to southern Myanmar.

References 

Cyrtodactylus
Reptiles described in 1905